Events in the year 2016 in Venezuela.

Incumbents
 President: Nicolás Maduro
 Vice President: Jorge Arreaza (until January 6), Aristóbulo Istúriz (starting January 6)

Governors
Amazonas: Liborio Guarulla 
Anzoátegui: Aristóbulo Istúriz then Nelson Moreno
Apure: Ramón Carrizales
Aragua: Tareck El Aissami 
Barinas: Adán Chávez 
Bolívar: Francisco Rangel Gómez
Carabobo: Francisco Ameliach then Gustavo Pulido Cardier 
Cojedes: Erika Farías then Margaud Godoy
Delta Amacuro: Lizeta Hernández
Falcón: Stella Lugo 
Guárico: Ramón Rodríguez Chacín
Lara: Henri Falcón 
Mérida: Alexis Ramirez then Ramón Guevara
Miranda: Henrique Capriles Radonski 
Monagas: Yelitza Santaella
Nueva Esparta: Carlos Mata Figueroa 
Portuguesa: Wilmar Castro then Reinaldo Castañeda 
Sucre: Luis Acuña then Edwin Rojas
Táchira: José Vielma Mora 
Trujillo: Henry Rangel Silva
Vargas: Jorge García Carneiro
Yaracuy: Julio León Heredia
Zulia: Francisco Arias Cárdenas

Events
13 May – a state of emergency was declared by the president

Sport
5-21 August – Venezuela at the 2016 Summer Olympics: 87 competitors in 20 sports

Deaths

4 January – Andres Rodriguez, equestrian and businessperson (b. 1984).

10 January – Hernán Gamboa, musician (b. 1946).

10 January – Cornelis Zitman, sculptor (b. 1926).

18 January – Pablo Manavello, composer, guitarist, singer and songwriter (b. 1950)

24 January – Teófilo Rodríguez, criminal (b. 1971).

14 February – Peter Bottome, businessperson (b. 1937)

14 February – Anselmo López, bandola player (b. 1934)

23 February – Luis Alberto Machado, lawyer and writer (b. 1932)

4 March – Ramón Palomares, poet (b. 1935)

22 May – Alexis Navarro, politician and diplomat (b. 1946)

7 June – Rubén Quevedo, baseball player (b. 1979)

18 June – Susana Duijm, actress, television host, beauty queen, Miss World 1955 winner (b. 1936)

29 June – Inocente Carreño, composer (b. 1919)

2 July – Carlos Morocho Hernández, professional boxer, world champion (b. 1940)

5 July – Alirio Díaz, classical guitarist and composer (b. 1923)

17 July – Aníbal José Chávez Frías, politician (b. 1957)

1 August – Oscar Celli Gerbasi, politician (b. 1946)

7 August – Rodolfo Camacho, cyclist (b. 1975)

23 August – Mercedes Pulido, politician and diplomat (b. 1938)

6 September – Alfredo Peña, journalist and politician (b. 1944)

18 November – Kervin Piñerua, volleyball player (b. 1991)

24 November – Luis Miquilena, politician (b. 1919)

25 November – Bernardo Álvarez Herrera, diplomat (b. 1956)

References

 
2010s in Venezuela
Years of the 21st century in Venezuela
Venezuela
Venezuela